In enzymology, a quinoline-4-carboxylate 2-oxidoreductase is an enzyme that catalyzes the chemical reaction

quinoline-4-carboxylate + acceptor + H2O  2-oxo-1,2-dihydroquinoline-4-carboxylate + reduced acceptor

The 3 substrates of this enzyme are quinoline-4-carboxylate, acceptor, and H2O, whereas its two products are 2-oxo-1,2-dihydroquinoline-4-carboxylate and reduced acceptor.

This enzyme belongs to the family of oxidoreductases, specifically those acting on the CH-CH group of donor with other acceptors.  The systematic name of this enzyme class is quinoline-4-carboxylate:acceptor 2-oxidoreductase (hydroxylating). Other names in common use include quinaldic acid 4-oxidoreductase, and quinoline-4-carboxylate:acceptor 2-oxidoreductase (hydroxylating).

References

 

EC 1.3.99
Enzymes of unknown structure